Mikhail Mikhaylov or Mikhail Mikhailov is the name of:
Mikhail Aleksandrovich Mikhailov (born 1971), Russian basketball player
Mikhail Ivanovich Mikhaylov (1858–1929), Russian opera singer (tenor)
Mikhail Sergeyevich Mikhaylov (born 1981), Russian footballer
Mykhaylo Mykhaylov (born 1959), Soviet Ukrainian footballer
Mikhail Larionovitch Mikhailov (1829–1865), Russian writer
Mikhail Efimovich Mikhailov (1902–1938), a Soviet central committee member